Socks and sandals is a footwear combination. 

Socks and Sandals may also refer to:

Music
 "Socks and Sandals", a song by Format B 
 "Socks and Sandals", a song by Andrew Winton, featured on the album Glorybox Mechanics